St. Joseph is an unincorporated community and census-designated place (CDP) in the town of Greenfield, La Crosse County, Wisconsin, United States. It is part of the La Crosse Metropolitan Statistical Area. The community is located at the junction of State Highway 33 and county trunk highway M. As of the 2010 census, its population was 503.

Geography
St. Joseph is in southern La Crosse County, in the northeast part of the town of Greenfield. It is bordered to the west by the town of Washington. It is the only named community in the town of Greenfield.

To the north, St. Joseph Coulee leads to Bostwick Creek, a west-flowing tributary of the La Crosse River, which joins the Mississippi at La Crosse. To the south, tributaries run to Mormon Creek, which flows west directly to the Mississippi south of La Crosse.

Economy
The Franciscan Sisters of Perpetual Adoration have their retirement home in St. Joseph.

Notable people
Roman Catholic Bishop George Albert Hammes was born in St. Joseph.

References

External links
FSPA Community Profile, including information about Villa St. Joseph

Census-designated places in Wisconsin
Census-designated places in La Crosse County, Wisconsin